State Highway 154 (SH 154) is a state highway that runs from Cooper to Marshall in northeast Texas.

History
The route was designated originally on March 19, 1930 between Cooper and Quitman as a renumbering of SH 37A. A proposed extension west to Ladonia was added on February 8, 1933. On July 15, 1935, the extension was cancelled. On December 22, 1936, the extension of SH 154 to Ladonia was restored. On August 4, 1937, this section to Cooper was renumbered as new SH 247, and SH 154 was rerouted north over old SH 247 to northeast of Cooper. On November 16, 1937, SH 154 was extended to Gilmer. On September 26, 1939, it was extended southeast from Gilmer to Marshall along its current route. This extension replaced part of SH 155. On August 24, 1960, the section north of Sulphur Springs was transferred to SH 19. On August 28, 1961, SH 154 was extended north and west to Cooper, replacing part of FM 64. On January 31, 1969, SH 154 was extended southeast from US 80 to SH 43, concurrent with SH 43 to US 59, east to FM 31 and southeast concurrent with FM 31 to I-20. On November 16, 1987, SH 154 was rerouted through Sulphur Springs. On January 28, 2005, the section of SH 154 from US 59 to FM 31 was cancelled as it was never built, and the concurrent portions were removed, with the section of SH 154 south of Loop 390 to SH 43 becoming part of Loop 390.

Junction list

Notes

References 

154
Transportation in Delta County, Texas
Transportation in Hopkins County, Texas
Transportation in Wood County, Texas
Transportation in Upshur County, Texas
Transportation in Harrison County, Texas